He Xiaoke (born 24 January 2004) is a Chinese professional footballer who currently plays as a forward for Sabadell.

Club career
Born in Beijing, China, He first trialled at the academy of Shandong Taishan at the age of six, also trialling with Ghuangzou before joining Shandong Taishan at the age of ten. A short stint with Serbian side Red Star Belgrade followed in 2020, but due to the COVID-19 pandemic, he returned to China.

In September 2021, He joined Spanish side Sabadell. He made his debut in the Primera Federación on 18 December 2022, coming on as a substitute for David Astals as Sabadell lost 2–0 to Osasuna B.

International career
He has represented China from under-14 to under-19 level, captaining the under-15, under-16 and under-18 sides. He was called up to the under-19 side for the first time in July 2022.

Career statistics

Club
.

Notes

References

2004 births
Living people
Footballers from Beijing
Chinese footballers
China youth international footballers
Association football forwards
Primera Federación players
Shandong Taishan F.C. players
Red Star Belgrade footballers
CE Sabadell FC footballers
CE Sabadell FC B players
Chinese expatriate footballers
Chinese expatriate sportspeople in Serbia
Expatriate footballers in Serbia
Chinese expatriate sportspeople in Spain
Expatriate footballers in Spain